Charles Ray DeJurnett (June 17, 1952 – November 11, 2020) was an American football defensive tackle. He played college football at San Jose State. From 1974 to 1986, he played professionally in both the World Football League (WFL) and National Football League (NFL) for the Southern California Sun, San Diego Chargers, and Los Angeles Rams. DeJurnett was selected to the WFL All-Star team in 1975.

Early life and college career
Born in Picayune, Mississippi, DeJurnett grew up in Los Angeles and attended Crenshaw High School. After high school, DeJurnett played junior college football at West Los Angeles College. He transferred to San Jose State University, where he played on the 1972 and 1973 teams.

Pro football career
In the 1974 NFL Draft, the San Diego Chargers selected DeJurnett in the 17th round, 418th overall. DeJurnett began his pro football career with the Southern California Sun of the World Football League and played in 32 games for the Sun in 1974 and 1975. He was selected to the WFL All-Star defensive team in 1975.

He would remain in Southern California during his NFL career, playing for the San Diego Chargers from 1976 to 1980 and Los Angeles Rams from 1982 to 1986. In his NFL career, DeJurnett played in 118 games with 40 starts. He had a fumble recovery in 1980 with the Chargers. With the Rams, DeJurnett had three sacks in 1984 and one sack in 1985.

Personal life
DeJurnett was married. On November 11, 2020, DeJurnett died from cancer at age 68.

References

1952 births
2020 deaths
People from Picayune, Mississippi
Players of American football from Mississippi
American football defensive linemen
San Jose State Spartans football players
San Diego Chargers players
Los Angeles Rams players
Southern California Sun players
West Los Angeles Wildcats football players
Players of American football from Los Angeles
Crenshaw High School alumni